The MIA's, in full Music Industry Awards, are Flemish music prizes that are awarded by the VRT in collaboration with Music Centre Flanders. The prizes replace the ZAMU Awards, last awarded in 2006.

The abbreviation MIA is a wink to Mia, a song by Gorki.

History 
The first MIA's were the 2007 MIA's, the winners of which were revealed on 30 January 2008; the show was broadcast by Eén two days later. There were twelve categories of award, nine of which were voted for by the public, the other three by the music industry itself. In 2007 the singer Milow from Leuven was the biggest winner, scooping three prizes.

At the second edition, on 6 February 2009, Milow was again the biggest winner. This time he took home five prizes, including those for best song and best male solo artist.

The third show (MIA's 2009) took place on 8 January 2010. Absynthe Minded and Daan (Stuyven) were the biggest winners. Absynthe Minded won the MIA's for Hit of the Year, best album, best rock/alternative and best band. Daan won the prizes for best male solo artist, best author/composer, best videoclip and best artwork.

In early December 2010 the VRT announced the nominees for the 2010 MIA's. The most nominated artists, with four or more nominations, were Stromae, Tom Dice, Bart Peeters and Admiral Freebee. The award ceremony was broadcast live on Eén on 7 January 2011. Stromae won the most important MIA, "Hit van het Jaar", as well as "Best Breakthrough". There was no clear-cut winner of the event. The most successful artists, all with two awards, were Stromae, The Black Box Revelation, Goose and Triggerfinger. Only at the 2010 show a MIA for "Kidspop" was awarded, with Kapitein Winokio as winner.

The 2011 Music Industry Awards ceremony took place on 10 December 2011. Milow and Selah Sue each took home three MIA's, and Gotye and dEUS two each.

The 2012 MIA's show took place on 8 December 2012. Also in this sixth edition the prizes were awarded during a live broadcast on Eén, this time presented by Peter Van de Veire and Cath Luyten. The biggest winner of 2012 was Triggerfinger. This band around Ruben Block won the awards in all four of the categories for which it was nominated. Triggerfinger won the most important MIA, the "Hit of the year", with the cover I follow rivers. They also won the awards for best group, best alternative music and best live-act. The prize for best album went to Balthazar for the album Rats.

Voting procedure 
Before the yearly show, the nominees are assigned by a broad media jury. (Music) journalists from both popular and specialized magazines, newspapers, radio and television participate at a preceding voting procedure in which each journalist kan indicate his/her favourite candidates per category. For each category the four candidates with the highest number of annotations receive a definitive nomination.
After the publication of the nominees, the broad public can bring out their votes for the majority of the categories. The winners of a limited number of categories are elected by professionals from the Flemish music sector. The Lifetime Achievement Award is chosen by the organizers of the MIA's.

Most successful acts
There have been numerous acts, both groups and individuals, that have won multiple awards. The table below shows those that have won seven or more awards.

References

External links 
 

Belgian music awards